"Power Struggle" is a song by the British band Sunna from the 2000 album, One Minute Science.

Music video
The video begins in an old abandoned house and inside were a large swarm of honeybees surrounding the house and Sunna appears playing throughout. At the next moment, a red car appears and a woman got out along with her groceries being carried. When she looks at the house, bees are flying everywhere and heads back to the car, grabbing her keys from her pocket but fallen after she was supposed to start her car. The bees are surrounding the car and the woman was still inside only to realize the bees are about to attack her. The video ends with the same shot of the house but included a dead beekeeper and an open jar that contains honey.

Track listing 

"Power Struggle (Album Version)" - 4:02
"Guinea Pig People" - 3:00
"Weather Controller" - 5:57

Chart positions

In media
The song is in Hollow Man when Sebastian is driving to work.

References

2000 songs
Sunna (band) songs
Virgin Records singles
Astralwerks singles